Kalka is a town in Haryana, India

Kalka may also refer to:
 Khalkha Mongols, a Mongol ethnicity
 Kalka, South Australia
 Kalka River (modern name Kalchyk), a river in Ukraine
 Kalka, Pomeranian Voivodeship, a village in Kartuzy County, Poland
 Kałka, a village in Człuchów County, Poland
 Kalka Mandir, Delhi, an ancient Kali temple in Kalkaji, New Delhi
 Kalka Dass, Indian politician
 Kalka (film), a 1989 Pakistani action film

See also
 Battle of the Kalka River